"Yippiyo-Ay" is a single by The Presets and the fourth taken from their second studio album Apocalypso. "Yippiyo-Ay" debuted on the Australian ARIA Singles Chart on 24 November 2008 at number 95 and later peaked at 72. No music video was made for the song. It was featured on the Australian version of the Ministry of Sound Clubbers Guide to 2009 three-disc set. The Presets have indicated that the song is essentially about handjobs.

This song was used during the Seven Network's coverage of the 2009 Australian Open, and on one episode of The World's Strictest Parents. The PSP version of the video game Gran Turismo included an instrumental version of the song.

Track listings

Charts

Release history

References

External links
 Listen to Yippiyo-Ay at Take 40

The Presets songs
2008 singles
2008 songs